The Algeti National Park (algetis erovnuli parki) is a protected area in Georgia, in the southeast of the country.
It lies in the region of Kvemo Kartli, within the Municipality of Tetritsqaro, some 60 km southwest of the nation's capital, Tbilisi.

The Algeti National Park stretches along the upper Algeti valley at the woody southern slopes of the eastern Trialeti Range, with the highest point being Mount Kldekari at 2,000 m above sea level. The park was founded under the Soviet government in 1965 as a state reserve to protect the easternmost limits of the Caucasian Spruce and Nordmann Fir. In 2007, it was reorganized into a national park.

See also 
Dashbashi Canyon Natural Monument
Birtvisi
Manglisi Cathedral

References 

National parks of Georgia (country)
Protected areas established in 1965
Geography of Kvemo Kartli
Tourist attractions in Kvemo Kartli